Salsa with Mesquite is the second EP from British intelligent dance music producer µ-Ziq. It was released on September 18, 1995, on the Astralwerks record label in the US and Hi-Rise in the UK. It is a pre-album EP to be followed up by In Pine Effect. The title comes from a flavour of Kettle Chips.

Track listing
"Salsa with Mesquite" - 7:25
"Happi" - 6:31
"Loam" - 6:08
"Reflectiv" - 6:52
"Leonard" - 6:05
"Balsa Lightning" - 6:49
"Balsa Lightning (Jake Slazenger Remix)" - 6:42

Notes: released as a Digipak in the UK and Standard Compact Disc in the US.

References

Mike Paradinas albums
1995 EPs
Astralwerks EPs